Woody Brown may refer to:

 Woody Brown (actor) (born 1956), American actor
 Woody Brown (surfer) (1912–2008), American surfer and designer of the modern catamaran